Bear Mountain is a remote  mountain summit in the Skagit Range of the North Cascades of Washington state. Bear Mountain is situated in North Cascades National Park. Its nearest higher peak is Mount Redoubt,  to the northeast. Precipitation runoff from Bear Mountain drains into Bear Creek and Indian Creek, both tributaries of the Chilliwack River. Access, either by the Chilliwack River Trail or from British Columbia, Canada, is difficult and takes two to three days.

Routes
 Diamond Life
 East Ridge
 North Buttress Direct
 North Buttress West
 North Face Buttress
 Northwest Buttress
 Northwest Ridge
 South Route
 The Diamond
 Ursa Major
 Ursa Minor

Climate
Bear Mountain is located in the marine west coast climate zone of western North America. Most weather fronts originate in the Pacific Ocean, and travel northeast toward the Cascade Mountains. As fronts approach the North Cascades, they are forced upward by the peaks of the Cascade Range, causing them to drop their moisture in the form of rain or snowfall onto the Cascades. As a result, the west side of the North Cascades experiences high precipitation, especially during the winter months in the form of snowfall. During winter months, weather is usually cloudy, but, due to high pressure systems over the Pacific Ocean that intensify during summer months, there is often little or no cloud cover during the summer. Because of maritime influence, snow tends to be wet and heavy, resulting in high avalanche danger.

Geology
The North Cascades features some of the most rugged topography in the Cascade Range with craggy peaks, ridges, and deep glacial valleys. Geological events occurring many years ago created the diverse topography and drastic elevation changes over the Cascade Range leading to the various climate differences.

The history of the formation of the Cascade Mountains dates back millions of years ago to the late Eocene Epoch. With the North American Plate overriding the Pacific Plate, episodes of volcanic igneous activity persisted. In addition, small fragments of the oceanic and continental lithosphere called terranes created the North Cascades about 50 million years ago.

During the Pleistocene period dating back over two million years ago, glaciation advancing and retreating repeatedly scoured and shaped the landscape. The U-shaped cross section of the river valleys are a result of recent glaciation. Uplift and faulting in combination with glaciation have been the dominant processes which have created the tall peaks and deep valleys of the North Cascades area.

See also

North Cascades
Chilliwack River

References

External links
North Cascades National Park National Park Service
Lists of john: Bear Mountain
Cascade Alpine Guide: Bear Mountain (Ebook preview)
Aerial photo of North Face: PBase

Mountains of Washington (state)
Mountains of Whatcom County, Washington
North Cascades
Cascade Range
North Cascades of Washington (state)
North Cascades National Park